V9 or V09 may refer to:

Transportation
 Fokker V.9, an experimental aircraft part of a series which led up to the low-production D.VI fighter
 USS V-9 or USS Cuttlefish (SS-171), a Cachalot-class submarine
 Hughes XV-9, a 1960s American experimental helicopter
 V9 Overstreet, a road in Milton Keynes, England
 BAL Bashkirian Airlines (IATA code)
 V9 Overstreet network of predominantly national speed limit, fully landscaped routes that form the top layer of the street hierarchy for both private and public transport in Milton Keynes, Buckinghamshire
 V9 2937 Bashkirian Airlines Flight 2937, a Tupolev Tu-154 passenger jet, and DHL Flight 611, a Boeing 757 cargo jet, collided in mid-air over Überlingen, a southern German town on Lake Constance
 Škoda-Kauba V9 Czechoslovakian aircraft

Science and technology
 Vivo V9, a smartphone by Vivo
 ATC code V09 (diagnostic radiopharmaceuticals), a subgroup of the Anatomical Therapeutic Chemical Classification System
 RAZR V9, a cell phone by Motorola
 SPARC V9, a 64-bit SPARC architecture
 V9 Unix or Version 9 Unix, a version of the Research Unix operating system developed and used internally at the Bell Labs
 Huawei Honor V9 a smartphone made by Huawei under their Honor sub-brand
 TARGET V9 a CAD computer program for EDA and PCB design, developed by Ing.-Büro Friedrich in Germany

Other uses
 V9, a grade in climbing
 V9, a grade in bouldering